Ricky Ford (born March 4, 1954) is an American jazz tenor saxophonist.

Biography
Ford was born in Boston, Massachusetts, United States,) and studied at the New England Conservatory. In 1974, he recorded with Gunther Schuller and then played in the Duke Ellington Orchestra under Mercer Ellington from 1974 to 1976. After this he played with Charles Mingus (1976–77), Dannie Richmond (1978–81), Lionel Hampton (1980–82), and then in the Mingus Dynasty (1982). He also played with Abdullah Ibrahim (1983–90) and Mal Waldron (1989–94), and has recorded with many other notable musicians including Yusef Lateef, Sonny Stitt, McCoy Tyner, Freddie Hubbard, Amina Claudine Myers, Sathima Bea Benjamin, Steve Lacy, and others.

Ford has recorded extensively as a leader for Muse and Candid.

He settled in Paris, France, in the 1990s. He taught at Istanbul Bilgi University from 2001 to 2006.

In 2009 he founded the Toucy Jazz Festival in Yonne, (France), and invited musicians including Rhoda Scott (2009) and Ravi Coltrane (2011).

Discography

As leader
New World Records
 1977: Loxodonta Africana with Oliver Beener, Charles Sullivan, Bob Neloms, Richard Davis, Dannie Richmond

Muse Records
 1978: Manhattan Plaza with Oliver Beener, Jaki Byard, David Friesen, Dannie Richmond
 1980: Flying Colors with John Hicks, Walter Booker, Jimmy Cobb
 1981: Tenor for the Times with Albert Dailey, Rufus Reid, Jimmy Cobb
 1982: Interpretations with John Hicks, Walter Booker, Jimmy Cobb, Robert Watson, Wallace Roney
 1983: Future's Gold with Albert Dailey, Larry Coryell, Ray Drummond, Jimmy Cobb
 1984: Shorter Ideas with Jimmy Knepper, James Spaulding, Kirk Lightsey, Rufus Reid, Jimmy Cobb
 1986: Looking Ahead
 1987: Saxotic Stomp with James Spaulding, Charles Davis, Kirk Lightsey, Ray Drummond, Jimmy Cobb
 1989: Hard Groovin' with Roy Hargrove, Geoff Keezer, Robert Hurst, Jeff "Tain" Watts
 1992: Tenor Madness Too! with Antoine Roney, Donald Brown, Peter Washington, Louis Hayes

Candid Records
 1989: Manhattan Blues with Jaki Byard, Milt Hinton, Ben Riley
 1990: Ebony Rhapsody U.S. Jazz No. 13
 1991: Hot Brass with Lew Soloff, Claudio Roditi, Steve Turre, Danilo Pérez, Christian McBride, Carl Allen
 1991: American-African Blues with Jaki Byard, Milt Hinton, Ben Riley

Other labels
 1994: Tenors of Yusef Lateef & Ricky Ford with Yusef Lateef, Avery Sharpe, Kamal Sabir
 1999: Balaena with George Cables, Cecil McBee, Ed Thigpen
 2002: Songs for My Mother
 2003: Reeds and Keys with Kirk Lightsey
 2009: Very Saxy with Rhoda Scott
 2010: 7095 with Ricky Ford & Ze Big Band
 2013: Sacred Concert with Ricky Ford & Ze Big Band

As sideman
With Ran Blake
Short Life of Barbara Monk (Soul Note, 1986)
With Jaki Byard
July in Paris (Fariplay, 1998)
With Abdullah Ibrahim
Water from an Ancient Well (Tiptoe, 1986)
With Steve Lacy
Vespers (Soul Note, 1993)
With Ronnie Mathews 
Legacy (Bee Hive, 1979)
With Dannie Richmond 
Dannie Richmond Plays Charles Mingus (Timeless, 1981)
The Last Mingus Band A.D. (Landmark, 1980 [1994])
Dionysius (Red, 1983)
With Red Rodney
The 3R's (Muse, 1979 [1982])
With Mal Waldron
Crowd Scene (Soul Note, 1989)
Where Are You? (Soul Note, 1989)
With Jack Walrath
Revenge of the Fat People (Stash, 1981)

References

External links
 Mathieu Perez, "Ricky Ford: Five or Six Shades of Jazz" (interview), Jazz Hot #668, Summer 2014.

1954 births
Hard bop saxophonists
Living people
American jazz saxophonists
American male saxophonists
Jazz musicians from Massachusetts
Muse Records artists
Candid Records artists
21st-century American saxophonists
21st-century American male musicians
American male jazz musicians
Mingus Dynasty (band) members
The 360 Degree Music Experience members